The Saint-Jean Canadiens (French: Les Canadiens de Saint-Jean-sur-Richelieu) were a minor league baseball team which existed between 1948 and 1955. Based in Saint-Jean-sur-Richelieu, Quebec the club competed in the Provincial League. The franchise was founded in 1948 as the Saint-Jean Braves. It won the league title in 1950, and was a class-C affiliate of the Pittsburgh Pirates from 1952 to 1955.

Season-by-season

Defunct baseball teams in Canada
Pittsburgh Pirates minor league affiliates
Baseball teams established in 1948
Baseball teams disestablished in 1955
1948 establishments in Quebec
1955 disestablishments in Quebec
Sport in Saint-Jean-sur-Richelieu